Texas hold 'em is a poker game. It may also refer to:
Texas Hold'em Bonus Poker: a card game owned by Mikohn Gaming/Progressive Gaming International Corporation
Texas Hold 'em: an Xbox version Texas hold 'em game developed by TikGames
Texas Hold 'Em Poker: a Nintendo DS version Texas hold 'em game developed by Skyworks

See also
Hold 'em (disambiguation)